Katherine Stewart may refer to:
Kat Stewart, Australian actress
Katherine Stewart (journalist), American writer
Katherine Stewart Flippin (1906-1996), African American special educator 
Katherine Stewart-Jones, Canadian cross-country skier 
Katherine Stewart MacPhail (1887-1974), Scottish surgeon
Katharine Stewart-Murray, Duchess of Atholl (1874–1960), British noblewoman and Scottish Unionist Party politician

See also
Catherine Stewart, New Zealand politician